Jon Øyvind Andersen (born 29 July 1965), mostly known as Jardar, is a Norwegian black metal guitarist. He was one of the founding members of the band Old Man's Child, with Galder and Tjodalv. He has played on all the band's albums, except Ill-Natured Spiritual Invasion (1998), Vermin (2005) and Slaves of the World (2009)
, where Galder was the sole guitarist. Besides as a guitarist, Jardar has also contributed with backing vocals, and he was also co-writer on two songs on In Defiance of Existence.

In 2005 he formed the band Insidious Disease, together with Silenoz, the Dimmu Borgir guitarist, singer Marc Grewe of Morgoth, the bass player Shane Embury from Napalm Death and drummer Tony Laureano.

Discography

With Old Man's Child 
In The Shades Of Life, Hot Records, 1994,
Born of the Flickering, Hot Records, 1995
The Pagan Prosperity, Century Media, 1997
Revelation 666 - The Curse of Damnation, Century Media, 2000
In Defiance of Existence, Century Media, 2003

References 

1965 births
Living people
Norwegian heavy metal guitarists
Old Man's Child members